Oskar Leupi (17 November 1932 – 22 January 2020) was a Swiss long-distance runner. He competed in the marathon at the 1964 Summer Olympics.

References

External links
 

1932 births
2020 deaths
Athletes (track and field) at the 1964 Summer Olympics
Swiss male long-distance runners
Swiss male marathon runners
Olympic athletes of Switzerland
Place of birth missing